Strictinin is a bioactive chemical of the ellagitannin family of hydrolyzable tannins. This compound shows activity against influenza virus.

References 

Ellagitannins
Phenol glycosides
Benzoate esters
Lactones
Pyrogallols